The Spider's Web is a 1926 Oscar Micheaux film starring Evelyn Preer. It was remade in 1932 as The Girl from Chicago.

The film is about a beautiful young woman from Harlem in New York City who travels to a small town in Mississippi where she receives unwelcome courting. She returns to Harlem.

Plot
Norma Shepard is a teenage Black girl from Harlem in New York City. While visiting her aunt in Mississippi, she is crudely and sexually propositioned by Ballinger, the son of a local white plantation owner. Ballinger later attempts to rape Norma at the aunt's home. Elmer Harris, a Black employee of the U.S. Department of Justice, is investigating illegal slavery in the area. Norma tells him about the attack, and he arrests Ballinger.

Norma convinces her aunt to move to Harlem. The aunt loses her life savings playing the numbers racket. With her last dollar, the aunt manages to pick a winning number. When she tries to collect her winnings from Martinez, the racketeer, she finds him dead. She takes her winnings from his safe.

The aunt is arrested for Martinez's murder. Elmer Harris, now working undercover in Harlem investigating the rackets, proves the aunt's innocence by discovering that wealthy Madame Boley killed her lover Martinez. Elmer and Norma wed.

Cast
Evelyn Preer as Norma Shepard
Lorenzo McLane as Elmer Harris
Edward Thompson
Grace Smyth as Madame Boley
Marshall Rodgers
Henrietta Loveless
Billy Gulfport
Dorothy Treadwell
Zaidee Jackson

References

1926 films
American silent feature films
American black-and-white films
Films directed by Oscar Micheaux
1920s American films